Olatunde Adeola Waidi (born June 13, 1983 in Owu) is a Nigerian football player currently with Kwara United F.C. of Ilorin. He is a defender.

Career 
He is otherwise known as ‘Libero', he hopes to adorn the national colours and pursue a career in a European clubside. Played for the Princess Jegede F.C. of Lagos (1995), Julius Berger F.C. of Lagos (1996), NEPA Lagos (1997–2000), Jasper United F.C. of Onitsha (2000–2003), Ebonyi Angels F.C. of Abakaliki (2004) and Kwara United F.C. of Ilorin (2005). He was a runner-up in the state FA Cup in Lagos in 1999, a state FA Cup winner with Jasper United F.C. in 2000, a bronze medal winner with Jasper United F.C. in the Italia/US Sam Marco Championship in Udinese-Italia in 2000.

References

1983 births
Living people
Nigerian footballers
Kwara United F.C. players
Association football defenders
Yoruba sportspeople
NEPA Lagos players
Anambra United F.C. players
Jasper United F.C. players
21st-century Nigerian people